In geometry, two conic sections are called confocal if they have the same foci.

Because ellipses and hyperbolas have two foci,  there are confocal ellipses, confocal hyperbolas and confocal mixtures of ellipses and hyperbolas. In the mixture of confocal ellipses and hyperbolas, any ellipse intersects any hyperbola orthogonally (at right angles).

Parabolas have only one focus, so, by convention, confocal parabolas have the same focus and the same axis of symmetry. Consequently, any point not on the axis of symmetry lies on two confocal parabolas which intersect orthogonally (see below).

A circle is an ellipse with both foci coinciding at the center. Circles that share the same focus are called concentric circles, and they orthogonally intersect any line passing through that center.

The formal extension of the concept of confocal conics to surfaces leads to confocal quadrics.

Confocal ellipses and hyperbolas 

The foci  thus determine two pencils of confocal ellipses and hyperbolas.

By the principal axis theorem, the plane admits a Cartesian coordinate system with its origin at the midpoint between foci and its axes aligned with the axes of the confocal ellipses and hyperbolas.

Each ellipse or hyperbola in the pencil is the locus of points satisfying the equation

with semi-major axis  as parameter. If the semi-major axis is less than the linear eccentricity  the equation defines a hyperbola, while if the semi-major axis is greater than the linear eccentricity  it defines an ellipse.

Another common representation specifies a pencil of ellipses and hyperbolas confocal with a given ellipse of semi-major axis  and semi-minor axis  (so that  each conic generated by choice of the parameter 

If  the conic is an ellipse. If  the conic is a hyperbola. For  there are no solutions. The common foci of every conic in the pencil are the points  This representation generalizes naturally to higher dimensions (see ).

Limit curves 
As the parameter  approaches the value  from below, the limit of the pencil of confocal ellipses degenerates to the line segment between foci on the -axis (an infinitely flat ellipse). As  approaches  from above, the limit of the pencil of confocal hyperbolas degenerates to the relative complement of that line segment with respect to the -axis; that is, to the two rays with endpoints at the foci pointed outward along the -axis (an infinitely flat hyperbola). These two limit curves have the two foci in common.

This property appears analogously in the 3-dimensional case, leading to the definition of the focal curves of confocal quadrics.

Twofold orthogonal system 

Considering the pencils of confocal ellipses and hyperbolas (see lead diagram) one gets from the geometrical properties of the normal and tangent at a point (the normal of an ellipse and the tangent of a hyperbola bisect the angle between the lines to the foci). Any ellipse of the pencil intersects any hyperbola orthogonally (see diagram).

This arrangement, in which each curve in a pencil of non-intersecting curves orthogonally intersects each curve in another pencil of non-intersecting curves is sometimes called an orthogonal net. The orthogonal net of ellipses and hyperbolas is the base of an elliptic coordinate system.

Confocal parabolas 

A parabola has only one focus, and can be considered as a limit curve of a set of ellipses (or a set of hyperbolas), where one focus and one vertex are kept fixed, while the second focus is moved to infinity. If this transformation is performed on each conic in an orthogonal net of confocal ellipses and hyperbolas, the limit is an orthogonal net of confocal parabolas facing opposite directions.

Every parabola with focus at the origin and -axis as its axis of symmetry is the locus of points satisfying the equation

for some value of the parameter  where  is the semi-latus rectum. If  then the parabola opens to the right, and if  the parabola opens to the left. The point  is the vertex of the parabola.

From the definition of a parabola, for any point  not on the -axis, there is a unique parabola with focus at the origin opening to the right and a unique parabola with focus at the origin opening to the left, intersecting orthogonally at the point . (The parabolas are orthogonal for an analogous reason to confocal ellipses and hyperbolas:  parabolas have a reflective property.)

Analogous to confocal ellipses and hyperbolas, the plane can be covered by an orthogonal net of parabolas, which can be used for a parabolic coordinate system.

The net of confocal parabolas can be considered as the image of a net of lines parallel to the coordinate axes and contained in the right half of the complex plane by the conformal map  (see External links).

Concentric circles and intersecting lines 
A circle is an ellipse with two coinciding foci. The limit of hyperbolas as the foci are brought together is degenerate: a pair of intersecting lines.

If an orthogonal net of ellipses and hyperbolas is transformed by bringing the two foci together, the result is thus an orthogonal net of concentric circles and lines passing through the circle center. These are the basis for the polar coordinate system.

The limit of a pencil of ellipses sharing the same center and axes and passing through a given point degenerates to a pair of lines parallel with the major axis as the two foci are moved to infinity in opposite directions. Likewise the limit of an analogous pencil of hyperbolas degenerates to a pair of lines perpendicular to the major axis. Thus a rectangular grid consisting of orthogonal pencils of parallel lines is a kind of net of degenerate confocal conics. Such an orthogonal net is the basis for the Cartesian coordinate system.

Graves's theorem 

In 1850 the Irish bishop Charles Graves proved and published the following method for the construction of confocal ellipses with help of a string:
 If one surrounds a given ellipse E by a closed string, which is longer than the given ellipse's circumference, and draws a curve similar to the gardener's construction of an ellipse (see diagram), then one gets an ellipse, that is confocal to E.
The proof of this theorem uses elliptical integrals  and is contained in Klein's book.
Otto Staude extended this method to the construction of confocal ellipsoids (see Klein's book).

If ellipse E collapses to a line segment , one gets a slight variation of the gardener's method drawing an ellipse with foci .

Confocal quadrics 

Two quadric surfaces are confocal if they share the same axes and if their intersections with each plane of symmetry are confocal conics. Analogous to conics, nondegenerate pencils of confocal quadrics come in two types: triaxial ellipsoids, hyperboloids of one sheet, and hyperboloids of two sheets; and elliptic paraboloids, hyperbolic paraboloids, and elliptic paraboloids opening in the opposite direction.

A triaxial ellipsoid with semi-axes  where  determines a pencil of confocal quadrics. Each quadric, generated by a parameter  is the locus of points satisfying the equation:

If , the quadric is an ellipsoid; if  (in the diagram: blue), it is a hyperboloid of one sheet; if  it is a hyperboloid of two sheets. For  there are no solutions.

Focal curves 

Limit surfaces for :

As the parameter  approaches the value  from below, the limit ellipsoid is infinitely flat, or more precisely is the area of the --plane consisting of the ellipse

and its doubly covered interior (in the diagram: below, on the left, red).

As  approaches  from above, the limit hyperboloid of one sheet is infinitely flat, or more precisely is the area of the --plane consisting of the same ellipse  and its doubly covered exterior (in the diagram: bottom, on the left, blue).

The two limit surfaces have the points of ellipse  in common.

Limit surfaces for :

Similarly, as  approaches  from above and below, the respective limit hyperboloids (in diagram: bottom, right, blue and purple) have the hyperbola
 
in common.

Focal curves:

The foci of the ellipse  are the vertices of the hyperbola  and vice versa.

Reverse: Because any quadric of the pencil of confocal quadrics determined by  can be constructed by a pins-and-string method (see ellipsoid) the focal conics  play the role of infinite many foci and are called focal curves of the pencil of confocal quadrics.

Threefold orthogonal system 
Analogous to the case of confocal ellipses/hyperbolas,
 Any point   with  lies on exactly one surface of any of the three types of confocal quadrics.
 The three quadrics through a point  intersect there orthogonally (see external link).

Proof of the existence and uniqueness of three quadrics through a point:
For a point  with  let be
.
This function has three vertical asymptotes  and is in any of the open intervals  a continuous and monotone increasing function. From the behaviour of the function near its vertical asymptotes and from   one finds (see diagram):
Function  has exactly 3 zeros  with 

Proof of the orthogonality of the surfaces:
Using the pencils of functions

For any two intersecting quadrics with  one gets at a common point 

From this equation one gets for the scalar product of the gradients at a common point
 
which proves the orthogonality.

Applications:
Due to Dupin's theorem on threefold orthogonal systems of surfaces, the intersection curve of any two confocal quadrics is a line of curvature. Analogously to the planar elliptic coordinates there exist ellipsoidal coordinates.

In physics confocal ellipsoids appear as equipotential surfaces of a charged ellipsoid.

Ivory's theorem 

Ivory's theorem (or Ivory's lemma), named after the Scottish mathematician and astronomer James Ivory (1765–1842), is a statement on the diagonals of a net-rectangle, a quadrangle formed by orthogonal curves:
 For any net-rectangle, which is formed by two confocal ellipses and two confocal hyperbolas with the same foci, the diagonals have equal length (see diagram).

Intersection points of an ellipse and a confocal hyperbola:
Let  be the ellipse with the foci  and the equation
 
and  the confocal hyperbola with equation
 

Diagonals of a net-rectangle:
To simplify the calculation, let  without loss of generality (any other confocal net can be obtained by uniform scaling) and among the four intersections between an ellipse and a hyperbola choose those in the positive quadrant (other sign combinations yield the same result after an analogous calculation).

Let be  two confocal ellipses and  two confocal hyperbolas with the same foci. The diagonals of the four points of the net-rectangle consisting of the points
 
are:
 
The last expression is invariant under the exchange . Hence 

The proof of the statement for confocal parabolas is a simple calculation.

Ivory even proved the 3-dimensional version of his theorem (s. Blaschke, p. 111):
For a 3-dimensional rectangular cuboid formed by confocal quadrics the diagonals connecting opposite points have equal length.

See also 
 Apollonian circles
 Focaloid

References 

 
  See also "10. Other Geometries", .
 
 
 Ernesto Pascal: Repertorium der höheren Mathematik. Teubner, Leipzig/Berlin 1910, p. 257.
 A. Robson: An Introduction to Analytical Geometry Vo. I, Cambridge, University Press, 1940, p. 157.

External links 
 T. Hofmann: Miniskript Differentialgeometrie I, p. 48
 B. Springborn:  Kurven und Flächen, 12. Vorlesung: Konfokale Quadriken (S. 22 f.).
 H. Walser: Konforme Abbildungen. p. 8.